Magic Box (also known by its cover title as The Loved Ones' Magic Box) is the debut and sole studio album from Australian rock band The Loved Ones.  Since its release, it has become a cult favourite among fans of Australian rock music.

History

The group began work on the album in 1967. Despite having several national hits, their record label W&G Records would not allow the band 
to record in state-of-the art 4-track facilities. In August, the band would self-finance their own 4-
track recording session in Sydney.  These tapes were rejected by W&G, who thought the recording levels were too high and shelved the tracks 
altogether, preferring to record the band at the same sound level as a string quartet.

The band would disband after a disastrous two-week tour of Perth where the promoters disappeared with the money.  Magic Box was released shortly after using a combination of recently recorded songs, previously released singles and unreleased studio warm-ups ("Shake Rattle And Roll" and "I Want You To Love Me").

Releases and current mastering issues
The album was released in both mono and stereo by W&G Records in 1967 on both LP and reel to reel stereo tape.  The album remanded a popular seller and was reissued in stereo by Astor Records in 1977.

The album was reissued in 1985 on Glenn A. Baker's label Raven Records with a different track order and bonus tracks.  However, when the album was remastered, only the left hand channel of the stereo master was used. This means some instruments and an intro to 'Sad Dark Eyes' (an electric piano in the right hand channel) are missing on the Raven Records release.  The 1995 Karussell compact disc uses the Raven Records master as its source, meaning the true stereo or mono version of Magic Box has never been released on compact disc or reissued to vinyl since 1977. Both CD reissues included a Wild Cherries rehearsal take of 'Without You', which has been incorrectly attributed to the Loved Ones.

In 2019, the album was reissued for Record Store Day in hot pink coloured vinyl.  While the release restores the songs to their original 1967 track listing, this release still uses the faulty Raven master with the missing right channel.

Reception
The album received mixed contemporary reviews criticizing the production and that the selection of songs did not representing the band's sound: "...50 percent of it harks back to the jazz scene of the 30s, and through it runs a silver thread of genius. Pity."

Since its release the album has acquired a cult following.  Though Allmusic gave the album a 4.5 star, writer Richie Unterberger said: "The rest of the material is usually less fearsome and innovative, though much of it still carries an air of subdued menace."

The album was included in the 2010 book, '100 Best Australian Albums'.

Track listings

Original 1967 LP release

Side A

Side B

Reissues

The Raven Records reissue and subsequent reissues have a mastering error where only the left channel of the stereo mix was used and panned mono.

1985 Raven reissue

1995 Karussell reissue

Personnel 
 Gerry Humphrys – vocals
 Rob Lovett – guitar, bass
 Ian Clyne - electric piano, organ
 Kim Lynch - bass
 Gavin Anderson – drums
 Treva Richards – electric piano
 Danny DeLacey – guitar

References 

1967 debut albums
The Loved Ones albums